Pilars may refer to:

 Wladyslaw Pilars de Pilar, Polish poet
 Juan Pilars (died 1521), a Spanish clergyman, appointed in 1514 as archbishop of Cagliari, Sardinia, Italy